Angela Cannings was wrongfully convicted and sentenced to life imprisonment in the UK in 2002 for the murder of her seven-week-old son, Jason, who died in 1991, and of her 18-week-old son Matthew, who died in 1999.  Her first child, Gemma, died of Sudden Infant Death Syndrome (SIDS) in 1989 at the age of 13 weeks, although she was never charged in connection with Gemma's death.

Her conviction was based on claims that she had smothered the children, but was overturned as unsafe by the Court of Appeal on 10 December 2003. Cannings was convicted after the involvement in her case of Professor Sir Roy Meadow, a paediatrician who was later struck off, then reinstated, by the General Medical Council.

Her defence solicitor was Bill Bache.

The Cannings case was re-examined after a BBC "Real Story" investigation showed that her paternal great-grandmother had suffered one sudden infant death and her paternal grandmother two. Professor Michael Patton, a clinical geneticist at St George's Hospital Medical School, told the BBC that a genetic inheritance was the most likely explanation for the crib deaths in the family.

Involvement of Roy Meadow
Expert witness Professor Sir Roy Meadow was later struck off the General Medical Council register partly as a result of his evidence at the Cannings trial. Meadow based his calculations on the likelihood of a second cot death being the same as the likelihood of a first, whereas in households where one crib death has taken place, the probability of another is greatly increased. He also asserted cot death implausible (which was contrary to the opinion of other specialists). Cannings later said Meadow should be "severely punished" for his testimony in her case and others.  Meadow was later reinstated to the GMC on appeal, a judge ruling that his errors did not amount to serious professional misconduct.

Other cases
The quashing of Cannings' conviction and other high-profile cases resulted in a review of 297 other cases where conviction relied on expert witness opinion. On 14 February 2006, Lord Goldsmith, the Attorney General, announced that three of these cases needed to be reconsidered by the courts.

See also
Munchausen Syndrome by Proxy
Donna Anthony
Sally Clark
Sudden Infant Death Syndrome
Trupti Patel

Notes

Further reading
Cannings, Angela. Against All Odds: The Angela Cannings Story, Little, Brown Book Group, 2006.   
Sweeney, John. "In the shadows of justice", The Guardian, 19 June 2006.

Overturned convictions in the United Kingdom
Year of birth missing (living people)
Living people
People acquitted of murder
People wrongfully convicted of murder